Boris Petrov Kovatchev is a professor at the University of Virginia where he is the founding Director of the UVA Center for Diabetes Technology, and a principal investigator of the JDRF Artificial Pancreas Project.

He received an MS in Mathematics from Sofia University, Bulgaria where he also completed his PhD in Mathematics in 1989.

He and his team of more than 25 investigators at UVA have been working on the integration of continuous glucose monitors and insulin pumps to create a closed-loop system requiring little or no intervention by the user. He holds 38 patents for technology related to diabetes and blood glucose monitoring.

In 2008, he became the first mathematician to be awarded the international Diabetes Technology Leadership Award, presented by the Diabetes Technology Society, and in 2013, he was awarded the prestigious Gerold & Kayla Grodsky Basic Research Scientist Award for leadership and innovation in type 1 diabetes.

He has an h-index of 85 according to Google Scholar.

References 

Year of birth missing (living people)
Living people
Sofia University alumni
University of Virginia School of Medicine faculty
American biomedical engineers